Robert Francis Rossiter Jr. (born July 16, 1956) is the Chief United States district judge of the United States District Court for the District of Nebraska.

Biography
Rossiter received a Bachelor of Science degree in 1978 from Purdue University. He received a Juris Doctor, cum laude, in 1981 from Creighton University School of Law. He was a law clerk for Judge C. Arlen Beam of the United States District Court for the District of Nebraska from 1982 to 1983. From 1983 to 2016, he  worked at the Omaha, Nebraska, law firm of Fraser Stryker PC LLO, becoming a shareholder in 1987. He served on the firm's Management Committee from 2011 to 2016. He specialized in labor and employment litigation, primarily in federal court. He is a Fellow (Judicial) in the American College of Trial Lawyers and is the past State Chair of that organization. He has served as Adjunct faculty for Creighton University School of Law from 1983 to 1987 and again from 1999–present.

Federal judicial service
On June 11, 2015, President Barack Obama nominated Rossiter to serve as a United States District Judge of the United States District Court for the District of Nebraska, to the seat vacated by Judge Joseph Bataillon, who assumed senior status on October 3, 2014. He received a hearing before the Judiciary Committee on September 30, 2015. On October 29, 2015 his nomination was reported out of committee by a voice vote. On June 27, 2016 the United States Senate confirmed his nomination by a 90–0 vote. He received his judicial commission on June 29, 2016. He became Chief Judge on July 15, 2021.

References

External links

1956 births
Living people
20th-century American lawyers
21st-century American judges
21st-century American lawyers
Creighton University faculty
Creighton University School of Law alumni
Judges of the United States District Court for the District of Nebraska
Nebraska lawyers
People from Jacksonville, North Carolina
Purdue University alumni
United States district court judges appointed by Barack Obama